Andamooka may refer to:

Andamooka, South Australia, a town and locality
Andamooka Opal, a gemstone presented to Queen Elizabeth II 
Andamooka Station, a pastoral lease in South Australia
Andamooka Airport, an airport in South Australia